Robert Nance Cluck, Jr. (born March 20, 1939) was the mayor of Arlington, Texas, and an obstetrician-gynecologist.  He was elected to the office of Mayor of the City of Arlington in May 2003 after serving two terms on the city council. He represented Council District 4. On May 9, 2015, Cluck was defeated by Jeff Williams, who is now mayor of the City of Arlington.

Cluck is the vice president for medical affairs at Arlington Memorial Hospital, a position he has held since 2002. Prior to that, he was the medical director at Arlington Memorial Hospital and Harris Methodist Health Plan.

Cluck was born in Cisco, Texas. His father Robert Nance Cluck, Sr. was superintendent of the Cisco Independent School District for 16 years and was the first president of Cisco Junior College. Robert Cluck, Jr. graduated from Southern Methodist University with a bachelor's degree in 1960 and the University of Texas Southwestern Medical Center in 1964. From 1964 to 1965, Cluck had a rotating internship at the Parkland Memorial Hospital of Dallas followed by a general practice residency at the John Peter Smith Hospital of Fort Worth. Cluck then served in the United States Air Force from 1966 to 1968 and returned to medicine with an OB-GYN residency at Parkland Hospital. From 1971 to 1994, Cluck was in private practice as an obstetrician-gynecologist in Arlington. Cluck served in the U.S. Air Force for two years, serving during the Vietnam War as a general medical officer at Clark Air Force Base in the Philippines.

He serves on many boards and commissions, including the Arlington Chamber of Commerce board of directors, the Texas Municipal League board of directors, the University of Texas Metroplex Council, and the Workforce Solutions Workforce Governing Board.

Ryan Walker Grant tried to hire individuals from Mexico, through an intermediary from Mexico to kill Robert Cluck and Tom Brandt, a Dallas attorney who represents the city of Arlington in cases involving sexually oriented businesses.

See also
2003 Arlington mayoral election
2005 Arlington mayoral election
2007 Arlington mayoral election
2009 Arlington mayoral election
2011 Arlington mayoral election
2013 Arlington mayoral election
2015 Arlington mayoral election

References

External links
bio at city website''

1939 births
Living people
Mayors of Arlington, Texas
American gynecologists
American obstetricians
United States Air Force officers
Texas Republicans
University of Texas Southwestern Medical Center alumni
Southern Methodist University alumni
People from Cisco, Texas
Military personnel from Texas